Kenneth Paul Mellor is an Anglican priest.

He was born on 11 August 1949, educated at Southampton University and Ripon College Cuddesdon and ordained in 1974. After a curacies at St Mary the Virgin, Cottingham and All Saints, Ascot he held incumbencies at St Mary Magdalen, Tilehurst and St Lalluwy, Menheniot he became  Canon Treasurer and Canon Residentiary at Truro Cathedral. From 2003 to 2015, he was Dean of Guernsey, Rector of St Peter Port and Priest in charge of Sark. He was succeeded by Timothy Barker in November 2015.

References

1949 births
Alumni of the University of Southampton
Alumni of Ripon College Cuddesdon
Guernsey Anglicans
Church of England deans
Deans of Guernsey
Living people
20th-century Anglican priests